Abdüllâtif Naci Eldeniz (1875 – March 20, 1948) was an officer of the Ottoman Army, a general of the Turkish Army, and a politician of the Republic of Turkey.

Works
Tapsıra
Transval
Rus-Japon Harbi
Mukden Muharebesi (translation)
Sevk ve Muharebe Talimnamesi (translation)
Rumeli Mersiyesi (poem)

Medals and decorations
Order of the Medjidie 2nd class
Silver Medal of Imtiyaz
Austria-Hungary Military Merit Medal (Austria-Hungary)
Prussia Order of the Red Eagle 2nd class
Prussia Order of the Crown (Prussia) 2nd class
Medal of Independence with Red Ribbon & Citation

See also
List of high-ranking commanders of the Turkish War of Independence

Sources

External links

1875 births
1948 deaths
People from Bitola
People from Manastir vilayet
Macedonian Turks
Republican People's Party (Turkey) politicians
Deputies of Osmaniye
Deputies of Adana
Ottoman Army officers
Turkish Army generals
Ottoman military personnel of the Balkan Wars
Ottoman military personnel of World War I
Turkish military personnel of the Turkish War of Independence
Ottoman Military Academy alumni
Recipients of the Order of the Medjidie, 2nd class
Recipients of the Liakat Medal
Recipients of the Imtiyaz Medal
Recipients of the Medal of Independence with Red Ribbon (Turkey)
Burials at Turkish State Cemetery